The South American Games is a quadrennial event which began in 1978.  The Games records in athletics are set by athletes who are representing one of the
ODESUR's member federations.  The following list of records is assembled
from different sources. There is no information on wind and/or heats for early competitions.

Men's records

Women's records

Mixed records

Records in defunct events

Men's events

Women's events

A = affected by altitude

See also
List of South American records in athletics
List of South American Under-23 Championships records
List of South American Junior Championships records

References

External links

South American
Records
Athletics
South American Games